The 2004–05 UEFA Champions League was the 50th season of UEFA's premier European club football tournament, and the 13th since it was rebranded as the UEFA Champions League in 1992. The competition was won by Liverpool, who beat Milan on penalties in the final, having come back from 3–0 down at half-time. Liverpool captain Steven Gerrard was named as UEFA's Footballer of the Year for his key role in the final and throughout the Champions League season. The final, played at the Atatürk Olympic Stadium in Istanbul, Turkey, is often regarded as one of the best in the history of the tournament.

As it was their fifth European Cup title, Liverpool were awarded the trophy permanently, and received the UEFA Badge of Honour. A new trophy was made for the 2005–06 season.

Porto were the defending champions, but were eliminated by Milan's cross-city rival Internazionale in the first knockout round.

Association team allocation
A total of 72 teams from 48 of the 52 UEFA member associations participated in the 2004–05 UEFA Champions League (the exception being Liechtenstein, which does not organise a domestic league, Andorra and San Marino). Kazakhstan also did not participate this year as none of their clubs were able to obtain UEFA license. The association ranking based on the UEFA country coefficients was used to determine the number of participating teams for each association:
Associations 1–3 each have four teams qualify.
Associations 4–6 each have three teams qualify.
Associations 7–15 each have two teams qualify.
Associations 16–49 (except Liechtenstein) each have one team qualify.

Association ranking
For the 2004–05 UEFA Champions League, the associations are allocated places according to their 2003 UEFA country coefficients, which takes into account their performance in European competitions from 1998–1999 to 2002–03.

Apart from the allocation based on the country coefficients, associations may have additional teams participating in the Champions League, as noted below:

Distribution
Since the title holders (Porto) qualified for the Champions League group stage through their domestic league, and the group stage spot reserved for the title holders is vacated, while no team from Kazakhstan was admitted, the following changes to the default access list are made:
The champions of association 10 (Turkey) are promoted from the third qualifying round to the group stage.
The champions of association 16 (Austria) are promoted from the second qualifying round to the third qualifying round.
The champions of associations 26, 27 and 28 (Romania, Hungary and Cyprus) are promoted from the first qualifying round to the second qualifying round.

Teams
League positions of the previous season shown in parentheses (TH: Champions League title holders).

Notes

Round and draw dates
The schedule of the competition is as follows (all draws are held at UEFA headquarters in Nyon, Switzerland, unless stated otherwise).

Notes

Qualifying rounds

First qualifying round

|}

Second qualifying round

|}

Third qualifying round

|}

Group stage

16 winners from the third qualifying round, 10 champions from countries ranked 1–10, and six second-placed teams from countries ranked 1–6 were drawn into eight groups of four teams each. The top two teams in each group will advance to the Champions League play-offs, while the third-placed teams will advance to the third round of the UEFA Cup.

Tiebreakers, if necessary, are applied in the following order:
Points earned in head-to-head matches between the tied teams.
Total goals scored in head-to-head matches between the tied teams.
Away goals scored in head-to-head matches between the tied teams.
Cumulative goal difference in all group matches.
Total goals scored in all group matches.
Higher UEFA coefficient going into the competition.

Maccabi Tel Aviv made their debut appearance in the group stage.

Group A

Group B

Group C

Group D

Group E

Group F

Group G

Group H

Knockout stage

Bracket

Round of 16

|}

Quarter-finals

|}

Semi-finals

|}

Final

As winners of the competition, Liverpool went on to represent UEFA at the 2005 FIFA Club World Cup.

Statistics
Statistics exclude qualifying rounds.

Top goalscorers

Source: Top Scorers – Final – Wednesday 25 May 2005 (after match)

Top assists

Source:

See also
2004–05 UEFA Cup
2005 UEFA Super Cup
2005 FIFA Club World Championship
2004–05 UEFA Women's Cup

References

External links

 2004–05 All matches – season at UEFA website
 2004–05 season at UEFA website
 European Club Results at RSSSF
 All scorers 2004–05 UEFA Champions League (excluding qualifying round) according to protocols UEFA + all scorers qualifying round
 2004/05 UEFA Champions League - results and line-ups (archive)
 2004–05 List of participants

 
1
UEFA Champions League seasons